Coreius septentrionalis is a species of ray-finned fish in the genus Coreius endemic to the Yellow River in China.

References

Coreius
Cyprinid fish of Asia
Freshwater fish of China
Fish described in 1925